The Roman mole (Talpa romana) is a species of mammal in the family Talpidae. It is found in southern Italy. It was last recorded on Sicily in 1885. There is also an unconfirmed report about an isolated subpopulation in the Var region of southern France.

References

Talpa
Mammals of Europe
Mammals described in 1902
Taxa named by Oldfield Thomas
Endemic fauna of Italy
Taxonomy articles created by Polbot